The 2013 European Athletics Junior Championships was the 22nd edition of the biennial athletics competition between European athletes in under twenty. It was held in Rieti, Italy from 18 to 21 July.

The medal table was topped by Great Britain with 9 golds, ahead of Russia and Germany.

Medal summary

Men

Women

Medal table

References

External links
Full results

European Athletics Junior Championships
International athletics competitions hosted by Italy
Rieti
Sport in Lazio
2013 in Italian sport
European Athletics U20 Championships
2013 in youth sport